WKXL (1450 AM) is a radio station broadcasting a talk radio format. Licensed to Concord, New Hampshire, United States, the station serves the Concord area. The station is currently owned by New Hampshire Family Radio LLC, itself owned by former Senator Gordon J. Humphrey, and features programming from AP Radio.

History

Early years

On December 6, 1945, the Federal Communications Commission (FCC) issued a construction permit to Charles M. Dale, then the sitting Governor of New Hampshire, for a new 250-watt radio station on 1450 kHz in Concord. The station signed on June 15, with studios in the historic Eagle Hotel and an adjoining building.

After five years, Dale sold WKXL to Capitol Broadcasting Corporation, a consortium formed by part-owners of WFEA at Manchester, for $50,000 in 1951. Under Capitol ownership, the station became a CBS Radio affiliate from 1951 to 1959 and again beginning in December 1962. The original principals in Capitol sold the company to H. Scott Killgore, a 20-year radio veteran, for $75,000 in 1954. That same year, Tom Shovan, who would be instrumental in shaping the careers of Rick Dees and Laura Schlesinger, started his radio career as a disc jockey at WKXL; he was just 12 years old.

Another sale followed three years later to Frank Estes and Joseph Close, owners of WKNE (1290 kHz) in Keene and WKNY in Kingston, New York. A power increase followed to 1,000 watts during the day, approved in 1961. The station expanded its service to FM when WKXL-FM 102.3, an 80 percent simulcast of the AM frequency and its middle of the road format, began broadcasting on March 7, 1972.

In 1980, Estes, who had bought out Close, sold the WKXL stations to a consortium of seven station employees, continuing under the name Capitol Broadcasting Corporation, led by Dick Osborne, Don Shapiro and Pat Chaloux, in a transaction valued at $1.5 million.

WKXL-FM was largely a repeater of the 1450 AM broadcast until 1986, when the owners launched a "light alternative" adult album alternative format; this format ended in 1991, when financial pressures returned the FM signal to a simulcast of the AM broadcast.

Vox cutbacks and restoration under Bailey and Humphrey

In 1999, WKXL and its sister stations were sold by their employee-owners to Vox Media Group. Major cutbacks in programming followed, including the cancellation of the station's "Party Line" program and live broadcasts of the city council; ratings fell as a result. After three years, Vox sold the station to Warren Bailey, operations manager of WLNH-FM in Laconia; under his ownership, more local programs were restored to the WKXL lineup, including a talk show hosted by Arnie Arnesen and New Hampshire Fisher Cats minor league baseball.

The station was acquired by former New Hampshire senator Gordon J. Humphrey, alongside business partner George Stevens, for $830,000 in 2004; former owner Bailey cited the sale as a "golden opportunity" even though he had owned the station just 18 months. The transaction separated WKXL from operational control of the 102.3 frequency, which consequently dropped its simulcast.

WKXL began airing on FM translator W280EC (103.9 FM) in the early 2010s. In 2014, the station acquired it outright from New Hampshire Gospel Radio for $5,000.  The 102.3 FM signal is now broadcasting as WAKC.

Notable awards
Several WKXL broadcasters have been honored by the New Hampshire Association of Broadcasters as Broadcaster of the Year, including Frank Estes (1979), Dick Osborne (1981, 1989) and Jim Jeanotte (2012).  Jeanotte was also the long-time host of Granite State Challenge, a New Hampshire Public Television high school quizbowl program.  Osborne was also recognized in 2004 by The New Hampshire Legends Hockey Hall of Fame, as WKXL broadcast University of New Hampshire Wildcats hockey for many years, along with other WKXL announcers Harvey Smith and Jim Rivers.  Jeanotte was honored in 2012 by the University of New Hampshire for his work on UNH sports broadcasts.

Notes

References

External links

 
 
 
 
FCC History Cards for WKXL

KXL
Concord, New Hampshire
News and talk radio stations in the United States
Radio stations established in 1946
1946 establishments in New Hampshire